Al Jenkins may refer to:
Al Jenkins (EastEnders), fictional character from EastEnders
Al Jenkins (American football) (born 1946), American football player
Al Jenkins, American boxer on List of US national Golden Gloves heavyweight champions
Al Jenkins (wrestler), British wrestler

See also
Albert Jenkins (disambiguation)
Allan Jenkins (disambiguation)